Rhynchorhamphus is a genus of halfbeaks.

Species
There are currently four recognized species in this genus:
 Rhynchorhamphus arabicus Parin & Shcherbachev, 1972 (Arabian flyingfish)
 Rhynchorhamphus georgii (Valenciennes, 1847) (Long-billed halfbeak)
 Rhynchorhamphus malabaricus Collette, 1976 (Malabar halfbeak)
 Rhynchorhamphus naga Collette, 1976

References

 
Hemiramphidae